Anelosimus luckyi is a species of spider found in Papua New Guinea. It is known only from the holotype specimen, found by Andrea Lucky in 2009 and after whom the species is named. It has a distinctive embolus, which differentiates it from other species. The sociality of the species is not known.

References

Theridiidae
Spiders of Oceania
Spiders described in 2012